Oliver's Mount is an area of high ground overlooking Scarborough, North Yorkshire, England. It offers views over the town, a tribute monument to the war dead, camping and caravanning at selected times of the year, 10 football pitches, 1 rugby league pitch, in the past a small school, and a cafe, but may be primarily known for its motorcycle races. Oliver's Mount first held a motorcycle race in 1946, and continues to hold motorcycle circuit racing today, and also holds car rally and car hill-climb events. Cars have raced here twice, in 1955 and 1956.

In 2016 Oliver's Mount was the summit for the final classified climb on the third stage of the Tour de Yorkshire cycle race.

The site also houses the broadcasting transmitter which provides TV and radio services to Scarborough and the surrounding areas.

Oliver's Mount is named after Oliver Cromwell, as it was thought that he had sited guns there, although there is no evidence that Cromwell visited Scarborough during the Civil War. This name was in use by 1804; previously the hill was known as Weaponness, which now refers to the area of the town around Oliver's Mount and Filey Road, and one of the wards of the borough.

Races 
The Oliver's Mount track is a street circuit composed of twisty public roads and has played host to domestic motorcycling and rallying events for many years. Spectators for race events are known to have reached 58,000. Oliver's Mount racing circuit is the only street circuit in England. Throughout the year it hosts four weekends of motorcycle road racing and numerous hill climb challenges. With the Ian Watson Spring Road Races, Barry Sheene Classic Road Races, Cock o' the North Road Races and The Gold Cup drawing riders and spectators from all over the British Isles. The races are organised by the Auto 66 club which attracts big name riders from the road racing scene. It is known as a technical and twisty track that requires a great deal of skill and bravery to tackle.

Oliver's Mount continues to hold motorcycle, car rally and car-hill climb events. Two Formula III events were held in 1955 and 1956.

In 2018, Oliver's Mount racing was cancelled due to safety concerns. As a result no racing took place. Following this, the ownership of the event changed from the Auto 66 Club and the council granted a lease to GrantRoberts Ltd to operate the track as Two-Four-Three Road Racing Association, headed by former racers Mick Grant and Eddie Roberts. In April 2019 GrantRoberts Ltd was renamed Oliver’s Mount Racing Ltd.  With support from Scarborough Borough Council, the venue hosted two events in 2019. These were the Barry Sheene Classic on 27 and 28 July and the Gold Cup from 27 to 29 September.

British Formula III

British Superbike Championship

Transmitting station

Services broadcast from Oliver's Mount are as follows.

Analogue radio

Digital radio

Digital television

Before switchover

Analogue television
Analogue television ceased from Oliver's Mount during August 2011. BBC Two was closed on 3 August and BBC One was temporarily moved into its frequency at the time to allow BBC A to launch in BBC One's old frequency. The remaining analogue services ceased on 17 August 2011.

References

Bibliography
 Peter Swinger (2001). Motor Racing Circuits In England Then And Now. .

External links

 Two Four Three Road Racing Association
  unofficial site, with history and pictures
 Photo galleries of Oliver's Mount mast from the mb21 website

Motorsport venues in England
Scarborough, North Yorkshire
Sport in Scarborough, North Yorkshire
Transmitter sites in England
Mountains and hills of North Yorkshire
Sports venues in North Yorkshire